Randolph Townsend (born January 24, 1947 in Los Angeles, California) is an American Republican Party politician from Nevada. From 1982 to 2010, he served as a member of the Nevada Senate, representing Washoe County District 4 (map). He served from 2010 to 2014 as a member of the Nevada Gaming Commission.

In 2002, President George W. Bush appointed Townsend to the New Freedom Commission on Mental Health.  He also chaired the Nevada Subcommittee to Study Mental Health Issues.  In 2003, he introduced a bill creating the Nevada Mental Health Plan Implementation Commission and was elected its chairman.

Townsend holds Bachelor's and master's degrees in Education from the University of Nevada, Reno.

References

External links
Nevada State Legislature - Senator Randolph J. Townsend official government website
Project Vote Smart - Senator Randolph J. Townsend (NV) profile
Follow the Money - Randolph Townsend
2006 2004 20022000 19981994 1990 campaign contributions

Republican Party members of the Nevada Assembly
Republican Party Nevada state senators
Members of American gaming commissions
1947 births
Living people
University of Nevada, Reno alumni